Jamestown High School, Former, also known as Jamestown Public School, is a historic school building located at Jamestown, Guilford County, North Carolina. It was designed by architect Charles E. Hartge and built in 1915.  It is a 2 1/2-story, Classical Revival style brick building with cast stone detailing.  It features a full-height tetrastyle entrance portico supported by Ionic order columns and pilasters.  The building underwent a major rehabilitation and adaptive reuse in 1986 and 1987.

It was listed on the National Register of Historic Places in 1991.

References

High schools in North Carolina
School buildings on the National Register of Historic Places in North Carolina
Neoclassical architecture in North Carolina
School buildings completed in 1915
Schools in Guilford County, North Carolina
National Register of Historic Places in Guilford County, North Carolina
1915 establishments in North Carolina